Ovozomus is a genus of hubbardiid short-tailed whipscorpions, first described by Mark Harvey in 2001.

Species 
, the World Schizomida Catalog accepts the following two species:

 Ovozomus lunatus (Gravely, 1911) – Australia (Christmas Island), Cook Islands, India, Mayotte, Réunion, Seychelles
 Ovozomus peradeniyensis (Gravely, 1911) – Sri Lanka

References 

Schizomida genera